Neoapterocis is a genus of beetles in the family Ciidae, containing the following species:

 Neoapterocis chilensis Lopes-Andrade, 2007
 Neoapterocis mexicanus Lopes-Andrade, 2007

References

Ciidae genera
Beetles described in 2007